Wangjiawan Station may refer to one of the following metro stations:

Wangjiawan station (Nanjing)
Wangjiawan station (Wuhan)